Controlled-environment agriculture (CEA) -- which includes indoor agriculture (IA) and vertical farming -- is a technology-based approach toward food production. The aim of CEA is to provide protection from the outdoor elements and maintain optimal growing conditions throughout the development of the crop. Production takes place within an enclosed growing structure such as a greenhouse or plant factory. 

Plants are often grown in a soilless medium in order to supply the proper amounts of water and nutrients to the root zone as well as supplemental lighting to ensure a sufficient daily light integral. CEA optimizes the use of resources such as water, energy, space, capital and labor. CEA technologies include hydroponics, aeroponics, aquaculture, and aquaponics.

Different techniques are available for growing food in controlled environment agriculture. Currently, the greenhouse industry is the largest component of the CEA industry but another quickly growing segment is the vertical farming industry. Controlled Environment Agriculture has the ability to produce crops all year round, with the possibility of increased yield by adjusting the amount of carbon and nutrients the plants receive (Benke et al).

In consideration to urban agriculture, CEA can exist inside repurposed structures, built to purpose structures or in basements and subterranean spaces. The trend is increasingly growing into alternative food networks, as entrepreneurs and households seek to meet the growing demand for fresh food products.

Technical implementation 
Controllable variables:
Environmental:
 Temperature (air, nutrient solution, root-zone, leaf)
 Relative Humidity (%RH)
 Carbon dioxide (CO2)
 Light (intensity, spectrum, duration and intervals) 
Cultural:
 Water Quality
 Nutrient concentration (PPM of Nitrogen, Potassium, Phosphorus, etc)
 Nutrient pH (acidity)
 Cropping duration and density
 Cultivar
 Pest controls

CEA facilities can range from fully 100% environmentally controlled enclosed closed loop systems, to automated glasshouses with computer controls for watering, lighting and ventilation. Low-tech solutions such as cloches or plastic film on field grown crops and plastic-covered tunnels are referred to as modified environment agriculture.

CEA methods can be used to grow literally any crop, though the reality is a crop has to be economically viable and this will vary considerably due to local market pricing, and resource costs. Currently, tomatoes, leafy greens and herbs are the most economically viable crops.

Motivation 
Crops can be grown for food, pharmaceutical and nutriceutical applications. It can also be used to grow algae for food or for biofuels.

CEA methods can increase food safety by removing sources of contamination, and increases the security of supply as it is unaffected by outside environment conditions and eliminates seasonality to create a stable market pricing, which is good for both farmers and consumers. The use of monitoring software and automation can greatly reduce the amount of human labor required.

CEA is used in research so that a specific aspect of production can be isolated while all other variables remain the same. For example, the use of tinted greenhouse glass could be compared to clear glass in this way during an investigation into photosynthesis.

A February 2011 article in the magazine Science Illustrated states, "In commercial agriculture, CEA can increase efficiency, reduce pests and diseases, and save resources. ... Replicating a conventional farm with computers and LED lights is expensive but proves cost-efficient in the long run by producing up to 20 times as much high-end, pesticide-free produce as a similar-size plot of soil.  Fourteen thousand square feet of closely monitored plants produce 15 million seedlings annually at the solar-powered factory. Such factories will be necessary to meet urban China's rising demand for quality fruits and vegetables."

Advantages of CEA over traditional field farming:
 Water efficiency 
 Space use efficiency  
 Reduced transportation requirements 
 Reliable year-round production 
 Protection from adverse weather events 
 Reduce fertilizer runoff 
 Pleasant working conditions

Urban impacts 
According to the findings of a USDA workshop in 2018:
indoor agriculture (IA) in urban and near-urban areas has the potential to act as a consistent, local, and accessible producer and distributor of fresh produce. If these farms are placed strategically, this possibility of local food production, processing, and distribution could be especially impactful for urban areas without reliable access to affordable and fresh produce. Such farms could also have far-reaching impacts in traditionally underserved communities by creating opportunities for training employment and business development in an emerging sector.

Industry 
As of mid-2021, reportedly 16.55 million square feet (380 acres / 154 hectares) of indoor farms were operating around the world. The State of Indoor Farming annual report suggests this will grow to 22 million sq. ft. (505 acres / 204 hectares) by 2022. (By comparison, the USDA reported 915 million acres (38 million hectares) of farmland in the United States, alone, in 2012.)

As of 2018, an estimated 40 indoor vertical farms exist in the United States, some of which produce commercially sold produce and others which are not yet selling to consumers. Another source estimates over 100 startups in the space of 2018. In Asia, adoption of indoor agriculture has been driven by consumer demand for quality. The Recirculating Farms Coalition is a US trade organization for hydroponic farmers.

A 2020 survey of indoor farming in the U.S. found that indoor production was:
 26% leafy greens, 
 20% herbs
 16% microgreens
 10% tomatoes
 28% other

AeroFarms, founded in 2011, raised $40 million in 2017 and reportedly opened the largest indoor farm in the world in Newark, New Jersey in 2015; by 2018 it built its 10th indoor farm.

Plenty, Inc., based out of South San Francisco, raised over $200 million in 2017.

Local Bounti, listed on NYSE Under the Ticker "LOCL" on November 22, 2022 after $1.1 billion business merger Leo Holdings III Corp (NYSE: LIII).

Economics 
The economics of indoor farming has been challenging, with high capital investment and energy operating costs -- particularly the price of electricity -- and several startups shut down as a result. A 2018 U.S. survey found only 51% of indoor farming operations profitable.

A 2020 U.S. survey found that typical indoor agriculture crops, per pound of crop yield, consumed between US$0.47 (for leafy greens) and US$1.38 (for microgreens) in inputs (especially seed, growing media, and nutrients) -- though tomatoes were reported at US$0.06 inputs per pound. Labor costs for container farms were reported at US$2.35 per pound. However, the same survey noted that indoor agriculture yields more revenue per pound than conventional field agriculture.

In the Asia-Pacific region, where burgeoning population growth conflicts with burgeoning space requirements for agriculture to feed the population, indoor farming is expected to have a compound annual growth rate (CAGR) of 29%, growing from a 2021 value of US$0.77 billion to a 2026 value of US$2.77 billion.

Advances in LED lighting have been one of the most important advances for improving economic viability. The high financial cost of investing in CEA presents a challenge that can only be overcome through research & development to innovate sustainable practices. The production potential of these farm networks justifies the investment in infrastructural value and contributes towards the 2030 SDGS to combat carbon footprint.

Organic agriculture 

In 2017, the US National Organic Standards Board voted to allow hydroponically grown produce to be labeled as certified organic.

See also
 Building-integrated agriculture
 Controlled Environment Agriculture Center (CEAC) at the University of Arizona
 Vertical farming

External links 
 Urban Agriculture Tool Kit, U.S. Dept. of Agricuture
 "Advances in greenhouse automation and controlled environment agriculture: A transition to plant factories and urban agriculture," January, 2018, Int J Agric & Biol Eng, Vol. 11 No.1, copied at USDA.gov
 "Indoor agriculture quickly gaining speed," May 21, 2015, Vegetable Growers News, retrieved January 09, 2022 (extensive data).

References 

Horticulture
Agriculture and the environment